Royal Bengal Tigers may refer to:

 Bengal tiger (Panthera tigris tigris)
 Royal Bengal Tigers (sports team)
 The Royal Bengal Tiger (film), a 2014 Indian Bengali-language film

See also
 Bengal (disambiguation)
 Bengal tiger (disambiguation)